Huayan is a school of Chinese Mahayana Buddhism.

Huayan may also refer to:

Huayan District, in Huarmey, Peru
Huayan Railway Station, a Yiwan Railway station in Hubei Province, China
Hwaeom, Korean transmission of the Huayan school
Kegon, Japanese transmission of the Huayan school